Robert Blackburn KC (born 1952) is professor of constitutional law at King's College London. He has written three titles for Halsbury's Laws of England, on constitutional and administrative law, parliament, and crown and crown proceedings, as well as writing and editing a number of other legal works.

Selected publications
The Electoral System in Britain. Macmillan, London, 1995. 
Griffith & Ryle on Parliament: Functions, practice and procedures. Sweet & Maxwell, London, 2001. (Editor with Andrew Kennon) 
Fundamental Rights in Europe: The European Convention on Human Rights and its Member States, 1950-2000. Oxford University Press, Oxford, 2001. (Editor with Jörg Polakiewicz) 
Constitutional Reform: The Labour Government's Constitutional Reform Agenda. Longman, 1999. (Contributor and editor with Raymond Plant) 
 King and Country: Monarchy and the Future King Charles III. Politico, 2006.

References 

1952 births
Living people
English barristers
Academics of King's College London
Alumni of the London School of Economics
Legal writers
Contributors to Halsbury's Laws of England
British King's Counsel
20th-century English lawyers
20th-century English non-fiction writers
20th-century English educators
21st-century English lawyers
21st-century English writers
21st-century English educators